Caroline Frances John (19 September 1940 – 5 June 2012) was an English actress. She played classical roles on the stage and also portrayed Elizabeth "Liz" Shaw in the BBC science fiction television series Doctor Who, as well as several other television roles.

Early life and education
John was the third of eight children born to Vera (née Winckworth), an actress and singer, and Alexander John, a theatre director. She was educated at St. Joseph's convent school, Crackley Hall in Kenilworth.

After training at the Central School of Speech and Drama, she worked in theatre and toured with the Royal Shakespeare Company and the National Theatre Company. She appeared in Juno and the Paycock in a 1966 production directed by Laurence Olivier, King Lear, Rosencrantz and Guildenstern are Dead, The Merchant of Venice and as Hero in Franco Zeffirelli's production of Much Ado About Nothing.

Doctor Who
John played the role of the Doctor's companion in 1970 opposite Jon Pertwee's Third Doctor. John was recommended to then Doctor Who producer Peter Bryant by another BBC producer, James Cellan Jones, who sent Bryant and his associate Derrick Sherwin photographs of her. Unlike most of the preceding and subsequent female companions of the Doctor, Shaw was a brilliant scientist and understood much of the Doctor's technobabble. Shaw and the Doctor discussed things on a more equitable level of intelligence, and the Doctor respected and rarely patronised her. New series producer Barry Letts believed the character was too intellectual to be a suitable companion to the Doctor and decided against renewing her contract for the next season.

During her final story, Inferno, John also played the part of Section Leader Elizabeth Shaw, an alter ego of her regular character that the Doctor encounters in an alternative time stream. John reprised the role of Shaw, albeit as a phantom, in the anniversary episode The Five Doctors, and also appeared in the special episode Dimensions in Time (1993), part of the BBC's annual Children in Need appeal. In the 1990s she appeared in a series of straight-to-video releases including The Stranger: Breach of the Peace, and as Liz Shaw in the P.R.O.B.E. stories written by Mark Gatiss and featuring numerous actors from the history of Doctor Who – including Jon Pertwee, Peter Davison, Colin Baker and Sylvester McCoy. In these stories made by the production company BBV, a pipe-smoking Shaw works as an investigator (for the P.R.O.B.E. organisation); John is seen opposite Linda Lusardi in the former model's first acting role.

John later appeared in two Big Finish Productions' audio dramas based on Doctor Who; Dust Breeding (2001), although playing a character other than Liz Shaw, and The Blue Tooth (2007) where, as Liz, she recounts in narrative form an adventure she once had with the Doctor and UNIT. After The Blue Tooth she played Liz in four more Companion Chronicle audio plays; Binary, The Sentinels of the New Dawn and Shadow of the Past. Her final audio play, The Last Post, which she recorded on 26 January 2012, was released after her death.

Other performances
After leaving Doctor Who and the birth of her first child, John appeared in the BBC drama series The Doctors playing the recurring role of Marilyn Lane for four episodes in 1971. In 1972, she appeared in the one-off BBC1 drama for the Omnibus strand, Actor, I said starring Barry Foster and Martin Jarvis, just a few weeks before appearing in the Z-Cars episode Operation Ascalon. For the next several years, John became a regular performer in BBC Radio dramas, which included appearances in Radio 4 series Afternoon Theatre, Five Morning Plays, The Monday Play, Saturday Night Theatre, Story Time and being a regular story teller on Woman's Hour. Various BBC radio productions covered in these strands were Thérèse with Vivien Merchant, Jane Eyre with Patrick Allen, How To Get Away With Murder, The Concert, New Grub Street with Robert Powell, Observations on a Jesting Man, Mr. Campion's Falcon, An Infinity of Changes and Jane Austen's Lady Susan amongst many others.  John played the role of Laura Lyons in the BBC adaptation of the Sherlock Holmes story The Hound of the Baskervilles, opposite Tom Baker. The four part adventure was produced by Barry Letts. She returned to radio for Radio 3's Light in Distant Rooms.

In 1987, John appeared in the BBC2 drama series A Dorothy L. Sayers Mystery: Gaudy Night as Miss Burrows. She also appeared in the BBC's adaptation of John le Carré's A Perfect Spy as Dorothy Pym. Throughout January 1988, John and her husband Geoffrey Beevers appeared in BBC Radio 4's Poetry Please. John and Beevers appeared together in an episode of Agatha Christie's Poirot titled "Problem at Sea" as Mr and Mrs Tolliver. They both had roles in the audio play Dust Breeding and the TV adaptation of the political thriller A Very British Coup, although they did not appear on screen together.  John appeared in several episodes of Casualty as recurring character Edith Hewlett. In 1995, she appeared as Janet Young in the BBC drama adaptation of Joanna Trollope's The Choir. Other minor TV appearances included EastEnders, It Might Be You, Silent Witness and Dangerfield.  John also appeared in a non-speaking, background role in the film Love Actually.

Her career in the theatre included appearances in His Majesty (1992), Silas Marner (1998), The Master Builder (1999), Death of a Salesman (2001), Happy Birthday Dear Alice (2002), and Dona Rosita (2004).

Personal life
John married actor Geoffrey Beevers, who appeared in Doctor Who as the Master, in June 1970. The couple had three children: a daughter, Daisy Ashford, herself an actor, who has appeared as her mothers Doctor Who character, Liz Shaw, in audio dramas for Big Finish Production, and sons Ben and Tom. She died on 5 June 2012 from cancer.

Credits

Film & TV

Tributes

References

External links 
 

1940 births
2012 deaths
20th-century English actresses
21st-century English actresses
Alumni of the Royal Central School of Speech and Drama
Deaths from cancer in England
English Shakespearean actresses
English stage actresses
English television actresses
Royal Shakespeare Company members
20th-century British businesspeople